Rishra High School or Rishra Uccha Vidyalaya  is a co-ed school for secondary and higher secondary level students. Besides having the usual secondary classes, it is equipped with fairly impressive standard Physics, Chemistry, Biology, Geography and Mathematics labs and offers higher secondary course in all streams, viz, Science, Commerce and Humanities. It also has a good collection of books in the library. The school is located in Rishra Municipality, in Hooghly district in the Indian state of West Bengal.

Address
4 &15, Tilakram Daw Ghat Lane, P.O: Rishra, Dist: Hooghly- 712248, West Bengal, India, Serampore Subdivision

History
Rishra High School is the oldest high school in Rishra, established by Babu Pramatha Natha Daw and Haridhan Daw in memory of their father Babu Hem Chandra Daw established in the year 1931.

Notable alumni
Many notable personalities which includes:
Late. Kalyan Mukherjee (B.Tech), Dr. Samar Banerjee (MD), Mr. Sandeepan Khan (WBCS), Dr. Sabyasachi Senapati (PhD) and many others.

See also
 Rishra Brahmananda Keshab Chandra High School
 Nabagram Vidyapith
Education in India
List of schools in India
Education in West Bengal

References

External links

High schools and secondary schools in West Bengal
Schools in Hooghly district
Educational institutions established in 1931
1931 establishments in India